Pearl is an unincorporated community in Jackson County, Colorado, United States.

History
A post office called Pearl was established in 1889, and remained in operation until 1919.  The community has the name of Pearl Burnett.

See also

References

External links

Unincorporated communities in Jackson County, Colorado
Unincorporated communities in Colorado